The River Thame  is a river in Southern England.

Course
Three streams which rise within the Vale of Aylesbury, on the northwest side of the Chiltern Hills, join to form the River Thame to the east of the small village of Hulcott, north of Aylesbury. The first 650m of the river form the boundary between Buckinghamshire and Hertfordshire. The Thame played a key role in the English Civil War when John Hampden (the town's Member of Parliament) led the force of Parliamentarians successfully defending Aylesbury at the Battle of Holman's Bridge, where a small road crosses the river, in 1642.

The river passes by the 21st century small suburb of Watermead and around the north and west of Aylesbury, passing through farmland to the villages of Nether Winchendon and Chearsley before reaching the market town of Thame with which it shares its name. In Anglo-Saxon England, Thame is a recorded place in records of the Diocese of Dorchester.

At Holton mill the Thame turns southward and after passing the villages of Great Milton and Stadhampton, its valley widens. In this area in 1642 and 1643, the river acted as a line of defence for Royalist Oxford. The bridges at Wheatley, Cuddesdon Mill and Chiselhampton were key crossing points, with Chiselhampton Bridge playing a critical part in Prince Rupert's movements before and after the Battle of Chalgrove Field.

Confluence with the Thames
Finally the Thame reaches the village of Dorchester on Thames, Oxfordshire. As the suffix -chester  indicates, a Romano-British settlement was on the site. The small town's central streets are typically Anglo-Saxon, being not quite straight and at various angles.

The upper River Thames has an alternative name, The Isis, until this confluence.

See also
Tributaries of the River Thames
List of rivers of England
River Thames#Etymology

References

External links
 River Thame Conservation Trust

Rivers of Buckinghamshire
Rivers of Oxfordshire
Thame